Travancoria elongata, which is also known as Periyar loach, (മലയാളം: നെടും കൽനക്കി) is an endangered species of freshwater fish only found in Chalakudy River and Periyar River, from the family of Balitoridae
(River loaches). Large-scale capture of these species from rivers in order to export them to the international market as ornamental fish has become a threat to this species. Included in the Red Data Book, they are on the verge of extinction.

References

External links
Periyar loach video

Taxa named by Rohan Pethiyagoda
Taxa named by Maurice Kottelat
Fish described in 1994
Balitoridae